The 1921–22 French Ice Hockey Championship was the eighth edition of the French Ice Hockey Championship, the national ice hockey championship in France. Club des Sports d'Hiver de Paris won their first championship.

Final
 Chamonix Hockey Club - Club des Sports d’Hiver de Paris 2:6 (1:2, 1:4)

External links
Season on hockeyarchives.info

French
1921–22 in French ice hockey
Ligue Magnus seasons